Beach soccer competition at the 2014 Asian Beach Games was held in Phuket, Thailand from 15 to 21 November 2014 at Saphan Hin.

Medalists

Results

First round

Group A

Group B

Group C

Group D

Final round

Quarterfinals

Classification 5–8

Semifinals

7th–8th place match

5th–6th place match

Bronze medal match

Gold medal match

Goalscorers

8 goals

 

7 goals

 
 
 

6 goals

 
 
 

5 goals

 
 
 
 

4 goals

 
 
 
 
 
 

3 goals

 
 
 
 
 
 
 
 
 

2 goals

 
 
 
 
 
 
 
 
 
 
 
 
 
 
 
 
 
 
 
 
 
 
 
 
 
 
 

1 goal

 
 
 
 
 
 
 
 
 
 
 
 
 
 
 
 
 
 
 
 
 
 
 
 
 

 Own goals

 
 

References

External links
Official website
Summary

2014 Asian Beach Games events
Beach
2014
2014
Asian Beach Games